In physics, Fujikawa's method is a way of deriving the chiral anomaly in quantum field theory. It uses the correspondence between functional determinants and the partition function, effectively making use of the Atiyah–Singer index theorem.

Derivation
Suppose given a Dirac field  which transforms according to a representation  of the compact Lie group G; and we have a background connection form of taking values in the Lie algebra  The Dirac operator (in Feynman slash notation) is 

and the fermionic action is given by

The partition function is 

The axial symmetry transformation goes as

Classically, this implies that the chiral current,  is conserved, .

Quantum mechanically, the chiral current is not conserved: Jackiw discovered this due to the non-vanishing of a triangle diagram.  Fujikawa reinterpreted this as a change in the partition function measure under a chiral transformation.  To calculate a change in the measure under a chiral transformation, first consider the Dirac fermions in a basis of eigenvectors of the Dirac operator:

The eigenfunctions are taken to be orthonormal with respect to integration in d-dimensional space,

The measure of the path integral is then defined to be:

Under an infinitesimal chiral transformation, write

The Jacobian of the transformation can now be calculated, using the orthonormality of the eigenvectors

The transformation of the coefficients  are calculated in the same manner.  Finally, the quantum measure changes as

where the Jacobian is the reciprocal of the determinant because the integration variables are Grassmannian, and the 2 appears because the a's and b's contribute equally.  We can calculate the determinant by standard techniques:

to first order in α(x).

Specialising to the case where α is a constant, the Jacobian must be regularised because the integral is ill-defined as written.  Fujikawa employed heat-kernel regularization, such that

after applying the completeness relation for the eigenvectors, performing the trace over γ-matrices, and taking the limit in M.  The result is expressed in terms of the field strength 2-form, 

This result is equivalent to  Chern class of the -bundle over the d-dimensional base space, and gives the chiral anomaly, responsible for the non-conservation of the chiral current.

References
K. Fujikawa and H. Suzuki (May 2004). Path Integrals and Quantum Anomalies. Clarendon Press. .
S. Weinberg (2001). The Quantum Theory of Fields. Volume II: Modern Applications.. Cambridge University Press. .

Anomalies (physics)